Zsolt Korcsmár (born 9 January 1989) is a Hungarian professional footballer who plays as a centre-back and right-back.

Club career

Újpest
Korcsmár played his first match in the Hungarian National Championship I against Budapest Honvéd FC in 2006. In the following season, he scored his first goal in the championship against Győri ETO FC. He joined Premier League side West Ham United for a two-week trial in December 2007. He played 96 matches and scored 12 goals in Újpest FC.

In the winter of 2010, Korcsmár tried out for several teams including SK Brann where he scored a goal in a friendly against Las Palmas. On 19 July 2010, Újpest FC and Brann announced that Korcsmár was loaned to SK Brann for the remainder of the 2010 season with an option for Brann to make the move permanent. The investment company Hardball helped Brann finance the transfer.

Brann
In January 2011, Korcsmár joined the Norwegian club SK Brann, where he played on loan from the Hungarian club Újpest FC. In his first season, Korcsmár played 811 minutes.

Greuther Fürth
It was officially confirmed on 14 May 2013 that Korcsmár would start the next season with German-side Greuther Fürth. He made his debut in the DFB-Pokal, against Pfeddersheim at an eventual 2–0 away win, where he scored the opening goal. On 30 August 2013, he made his debut in the 2. Bundesliga, against FSV Frankfurt at an eventual 1–1 away draw, where he played the full 90 minutes.

Vasas SC
He moved to Vasas SC on 1 February 2016.

International career
Korcsmár was captain of Hungary under-21 national team. He was part of the Hungary U20 squad that won the bronze medal in the 2009 FIFA U-20 World Cup. He played his first international match for the Hungary national team against Iceland at the Puskás Ferenc Stadium in August 2011. The match ended 4–0.

Career statistics

Club

International

Honours
FIFA U-20 World Cup: third place 2009

References

External links
 Zsolt Korcsmár profile at magyarfutball.hu
 Profile 
 
 Zsolt Korcsmár at NFF

1989 births
Living people
Sportspeople from Baranya County
Hungarian footballers
Hungary international footballers
Hungary youth international footballers
Hungary under-21 international footballers
Association football midfielders
Újpest FC players
SK Brann players
SpVgg Greuther Fürth players
Vasas SC players
FC Midtjylland players
Eliteserien players
2. Bundesliga players
Danish Superliga players
Hungarian expatriate footballers
Expatriate footballers in Norway
Hungarian expatriate sportspeople in Norway
Expatriate footballers in Germany
Hungarian expatriate sportspeople in Germany
Expatriate men's footballers in Denmark
Hungarian expatriate sportspeople in Denmark